Galen Stone (born September 1, 1988) is a former American football tight end. He played college football at Saginaw Valley State and professional for the Florida Tuskers and Sacramento Mountain Lions.

Stone was just one of two rookies on the Tuskers that had never played professional football before.

References

External links
Just Sports Stats

1988 births
Living people
People from Genesee County, Michigan
Players of American football from Michigan
American football tight ends
Saginaw Valley State Cardinals football players
Florida Tuskers players
Virginia Destroyers players
West Michigan ThunderHawks players